Sabitri Chatterjee (born 22 February 1937) is an Indian actress who is known for her work in Bengali theatre and cinema. Her career spans more than 60 years. She is the recipient of BFJA Awards for two times. In 1999,
she was conferred with Sangeet Natak Akademi Award for Acting in Bengali theatre. In 2013, she was awarded by the Government of West Bengal its highest civilian award; the Banga Bibhushan.
In 2014, Government of India conferred upon her its fourth-highest civilian award the Padma Shri.

She was born in Comilla, in British India (now in Bangladesh). During the partition of Bengal, she was sent to the safety of an older, married sister's house in Kolkata located at Tollygunge. At her teenage she got noticed by Bhanu Banerjee who took her to Uttar Sarathi group theatre for a role in their play Natun Ihudi. Later she emerged as a prominent thespian personality for the titular role in the play Shyamali which was staged at Star Theatre. She made her big screen debut in Uttam Kumar starrer Sahajatri (1951) directed by Agradoot and appeared as her first female lead in Sudhir Mukherjee's comedy film Pasher Bari (1952) which was a major success at box office. She is remembered for her roles in films such as Raat Bhor (1955), Upahar (1955), Abhayer Biye (1957), Nupur (1958), Gali Theke Rajpath (1959), Marutirtha Hinglaj (1959), Kuhak (1960), Badhu (1962), Bhranti Bilas (1963), Uttarayan (1963), Jaya (1965), Kal Tumi Aleya (1966), Nishipadma (1970), Dhanyi Meye (1971) and Malyadan (1971) to name a few. Soumitra Chatterjee described her as the finest actor he has worked with.

Early life and background
Sabitri was born in 1937 in a small town of Kamalapur in Comilla District of present-day Bangladesh and is youngest among ten sisters. Her father Sashadhar Chatterjee, who belonged to a famous Kulin Rarhi Brahmin family from a Kulin Brahmin village called Kanaksar in Bikrampur, worked as a station master in Indian Railways. During the partition of Bengal, young Sabitri was sent to the safety of an older, married sister's house in Kolkata located at Tollygunge – the hub of filmmaking in Kolkata. Being brought up in Tollygunge she often got opportunity to see filmstars of that time.

Career

Film career
When Sabitri Chatterjee was in class ten, she was noticed by veteran actor Bhanu Banerjee who picked her up for a role in Natun Ihudi, a play of Uttar Sarathi group theatre on the refugees from East Pakistan. The play was being directed by Kanu Banerjee – the actor who would later perform as Harihar Roy, in Satyajit Ray's Pather Panchali and Aparajito. Sabitri also acted the film version of the play which was released in 1953. She made her big screen debut in Uttam Kumar starrer Sahajatri (1951) directed by Agradoot and appeared as her first female lead in Sudhir Mukherjee's comedy film Pasher Bari (1952) which was a major success at box office. 

Sabitri Chatterjee's next film assignment was Subhada (1952) – a film based on a novel by Sarat Chandra Chattopadhyay and directed by Niren Lahiri along with Chhabi Biswas and Pahari Sanyal. In this film, she played the role of an unfortunate girl named Lalana. In the same year, she appeared in the Uttam Kumar starrer family drama Basu Poribar (1952), directed by Nirmal Dey, which had Supriya Devi in the role of Uttam Kumar's sister. Sabitri and Uttam Kumar had been friends since 1951, Uttam Kumar offered her to act in a theatrical production to be produced by his group Krishti O Srishti. The Uttam-Sabitri combination became a favourite of the Bengali cine-goers and their friendship withstood strong but false rumours of marriage.

They would be responsible for a series of films, including Lakh Taka (1953), Kalyani (1954), Anupama (1954), Raikamal (1955), Nabojanma (1956), Punar Milan (1957), Marutirtha Hinglaj (1959), Raja-Saja (1960), Dui Bhai (1961), Bhranti Bilas (1963), Momer Alo (1964) and Nishipadma (1970). They also had major roles in Mrinal Sen's first feature film Raat Bhore (1955) and Tapan Sinha's second effort Upahaar (1955).  Bhranti Bilas, Mouchak and Dhanyi Meye rank high among the Bengali comedy films. 

In the early eighties, Sabitri did not appear on screen as before. However, in the late 1980s, she came back with films such as Mamoni, Anandalok and Haar-Jeet.

TV career
Sabitri Chatterjee continues to act in commercial Bengali cinemas and television till date. She is one of the stars of the mega soap opera Sonar Harin, that has run more than 1000 episodes, which was aired on ETV Bangla. She has acted as Muktokeshi in the serial Subarnalata. (The title role was played by the National Film Award-winning Ananya Chatterjee), an adaptation of Ashapurna Devi's novel, which was aired on Zee Bangla and as Sona thamma in Jal Nupur which was aired on Star Jalsha.

She is acted as a senior matriarch of a family in the TV serial Kusum dola, which is aired in STAR Jalsha. She has played the master chef in Joto Hashi Toto Ranna, which is a fiction cum reality cookery show, where kitchen skills are weaved around a fictional plot revolving around a certain Gupta family. She played a minor role in 2012 Star Jalsja serial Tapur Tupur, and is currently playing the role of a yesteryear actress in Chokher Tara Tui. This TV serial is also aired in Star Jalsha. She acted in an Indian Bengali show named Andarmahal, which aired on very popular Bengali Entertainment channel Zee Bangla. She is currently acting in series of Dhulokona aring on Star Jalsha.

Awards
 The Bengal Film Journalists' Association (BFJA) Award for Best Actress in Supporting Role in 1967 for "Kal Tumi Aleya"
 BFJA Award-Best Actress in Supporting Role in 1972 for "Malyadan"
 Sangeet Natak Akademi Award for Acting in Bengali theatre in 1999.
 Kalakar Awards- Lifetime Achievement Award in 2003.
D.Lit degree from Kalyani University in 2012
 Banga Bibhushan Award in 2013 for her contribution to Indian Cinema.
 Padma Shri Award in 2014 for contributions in Film arts.

Filmography
 Aporajeyo (2022)
 Maati (2018)
Thammar Boyfriend (2016) ...  Nandini Mitra
 Praktan (2016)
 Highway (2014)
 Hemlock Society (2012)
 Podokkhep (2006)... Shobita
 Tapasya (2006)
 Har Jeet (2000)
 Bahadur (1992)
 Anandalok (1988)
 Mamoni (1986)
 Rajnandini (1980)
 Brojobuli (1979)
 Phool Sajya (1975)
 Mouchak (1974)
 Heerey Manik (1979)
 Sei Chokh (1976)
 Sesh Parba (1972)
 Dhanyee Meye (1971)
 Malyadaan (1971)... Patal
 Pratham Pratishruti (1971)
 Nishi Padma (1970)... Padma
 Kalankita Nayak (1970)
 Manjari Opera (1970)... Manjari Devi
 Pathey Holo Dekha (1968)
 Grihadaha (1967)... Mrinal
 Kal Tumi Aleya (1966)... Sonaboudi
 Antaral (1965)
 Jaya (1965)... Jaya
 Momer Alo (1964)... Deepa
 Shes Anko (1963)... Lata Bose
 Uttarayan (1963)
 Bhranti Bilaas (1963)
 Nav Diganta (1962)
 Dui Bhai (1961)
 Haat Baralei Bandhu (1960)
 Kuhak (1960)
 Raja-Saja (1960)
 Gali Theke Rajpath (1959)
 Marutirtha Hinglaj (1959)
 Daak Harkara (1958)
 Daktar Babu (1958)
 Punar Milan (1957)
 Abhoyer Biye (1957)
 Daner Maryada (1956)... Usha
 Nabajanma (1956)
 Paradhin (1956)
 Raat Bhore (1956)
 Raikamal (1955)
 Godhuli (1955)
 Paresh (1955)
 Upahar (1955)... Krishna
 Annapurnar Mandir (1954)
 Anupama (1954)
 Bidhilipi (1954)... Sandhya
 Bratacharini (1954)
 Champadangar Bou (1954)
 Kalyani (1954)
 Moyla Kagaj (1954)
 Kajari (1953)
 Lakh Taka (1953)
 Natun Yahudi (1953)
 Subhadra (1952)... Lalana
 Basu Paribar (1952)
 Pasher Bari (1952)
Ladies Seat
Protinidhi
Protishodh
Obaak Prithibi
Notun Diner Alo
Dinanter Alo
Baluchori
Montromugdho
Muktisnam

Subarnalata
Ishti Kutum 
Jol Nupur Chokher Tara Tui'' 
Kusum Dola
Mayurpankhi 
Mohor
Dhulokona

Notes

External links
 

Actresses in Bengali cinema
Indian film actresses
1937 births
Living people
Actresses from Kolkata
Bengali actresses
Bengali theatre personalities
20th-century Indian actresses
Indian stage actresses
Recipients of the Sangeet Natak Akademi Award
Recipients of the Padma Shri in arts
People from New Alipore